Robin Haase and Mate Pavić won the tournament, defeating French couple Jonathan Eysseric and Fabrice Martin in the final. Robin Haase won the singles competition, too.

Seeds

Draw

External links
 Main Draw

Open de la Reunion - Doubles